Richard "Richie" Daneault (born December 24, 1976, in Winnipeg, Manitoba) is a Canadian curler who resides in Quebec City, Quebec.

Career
Daneault first went to the brier in 2008 as a second on the Kerry Burtnyk team. Daneault's next major victory came when he won the 2012 Safeway Championship again as a second, but this time on the Rob Fowler team to represent Manitoba for the second time at the Tim Hortons Brier.

References

External links
 

1976 births
Living people
People from Carman, Manitoba
Curlers from Winnipeg
Canadian male curlers
Curlers from Quebec
Sportspeople from Quebec City
Canada Cup (curling) participants